is a city in Kumamoto Prefecture, Japan.

As of March 31, 2017, the city has an estimated population of 61,022 and a population density of 1,100 persons per km². The total area is 53.19 km².

The modern city of Kōshi was established on February 27, 2006, from the merger of former town of Kōshi, with the town of Nishigoshi (both from Kikuchi District). It was the 14th "Great Heisei Merger" in Kumamoto Prefecture.

Notable people

 Yudai Nakashima (1984–), football player
 Masato Uchishiba (1978–), Olympic judo wrestler
 Kyosuke Usuta (1974–), manga artist

References

External links

  

Cities in Kumamoto Prefecture